Mabira is a genus of achilid planthoppers in the family Achilidae. There are at least four described species in Mabira.

Species
These four species belong to the genus Mabira:
 Mabira cincticeps (Spinola, 1839) c g
 Mabira karaseki (Melichar, 1905) c g
 Mabira pallida Fennah, 1950 c g
 Mabira phylotas Fennah, 1957 c g
Data sources: i = ITIS, c = Catalogue of Life, g = GBIF, b = Bugguide.net

References

Further reading

 
 
 
 
 

Achilidae
Auchenorrhyncha genera